The Women's Individual Road Race at the 2003 Pan American Games in Santo Domingo, Dominican Republic was held on the seventh day of the cycling competition, on 2003-08-16. The race had a total distance of 85 kilometres.

Results

See also
 Cycling at the 2004 Summer Olympics – Women's road race

References
cyclingnews

Women's Road Race
2003 in women's road cycling
Road cycling at the Pan American Games
Cyc